Drugstore is the self-produced debut album by the Brazilian/British band Drugstore. It was released by Go! Discs in 1995 and it entered the UK chart at 31.

Track listing 
 "Speaker 12" 
 "Favourite Sinner" 
 "Alive" 
 "Solitary Party Groover" 
 "If" 
 "Devil" 
 "Saturday Sunset"
 "Fader" 
 "Super Glider" 
 "Baby Astrolab" 
 "Gravity" 
 "Nectarine" 
 "Starcrossed" 
 "Accelerate"

Personnel
 Mike Chylinski – drums
 Isabel Monteiro – bass, vocals
 Daron Robinson – guitar, piano

References

External links
'Melody Maker' end of Year Critics List 1995 - top 50 albums - ranked 14 (mid-page)
'CIN Creative Industries Network' Top 100 Ranking Albums of 1995 - ranked 53 (mid-page)

1995 debut albums
Drugstore (band) albums
Go! Discs albums